Desmond Nakano (born 1953) is an American screenwriter and film director.  He is Sansei, or third-generation Japanese American. He directed the feature films, White Man's Burden (1995) and American Pastime (2007).   His writing credits include the screenplays for the dramatic feature films Last Exit to Brooklyn (1989), American Me (1992), White Man's Burden, and American Pastime.

Filmography

Films
{| class="wikitable"
|- 
! Year !! Film !! Credit !! Notes
|-
| 1978
|The Kid from Not-So-Big
|Written By
|
|-
| 1979
|Boulevard Nights
|Written By
|
|-
| 1984
|Body Rock
|Screenplay By, Story By, Associate Director
|Co-Wrote Story with Kimberly Lynn White
|-
| 1986
|Black Moon Rising
|Screenplay By
|Co-Wrote Screenplay with "John Carpenter" and "William Gray"
|-
| 1989
|Last Exit to Brooklyn
|Screenplay By
|Based on the Novel by "Hubert Selby Jr."
|-
| 1992
|American Me
|Screenplay By
|Co-Wrote Screenplay with "Floyd Mutrux"
|-
| 1995
|White Man's Burden
|Written By, Directed By
|
|-
|2007
|American Pastime
|Written By, Directed By
|Co-Wrote Screenplay with Tony Kayden
|-
| 2018
|Three Days in the Hole"
|Written By
|Co-Wrote with "Candice Carella"
|-
|}

References

Further reading
 Interview of Desmond Nakano about American Pastime''.

External links
 
Desmond Nakano @ thetvdb.com
Desmond Nakano @ bfi.org
Desmond Nakano @ discogs.com

1953 births
Living people
American male screenwriters
American film directors of Japanese descent
American writers of Japanese descent